Lasse Petterson (born Lars Anders Pettersson; 8 April 1935 in Östersund – 30 March 2019)  was a Swedish actor.

Filmography

Film
91:an Karlsson muckar (tror han) (1959)
Barna från Blåsjöfjället (1980)
Höjdhoppar'n (1981)
Råttornas vinter (1988)
Roseanna (1993)
Sommaren (1995)
En liten julsaga (1999)
Om inte (2001)
Grabben i graven bredvid (2002)
As It Is in Heaven (2004)
One Step Behind (2005)

Television
Kråsnålen (1988)
Den vite riddaren (1994)

References

External links
http://www.sfi.se/sv/svensk-filmdatabas/Item/?type=PERSON&itemid=115543

People from Östersund
2019 deaths
1935 births
Swedish male actors